Mikko Ruutu (born September 10, 1978 in Vantaa, Finland) is a retired Finnish ice hockey forward.

Ruutu played for HIFK and Jokerit in the Finnish SM-liiga, earning a silver medal with HIFK and the SM-liiga championship with Jokerit in 2002. He was drafted by the Ottawa Senators as their 7th round pick in the 1999 NHL Entry Draft, but his only season in North America was for Clarkson University in the NCAA league. He has since retired from professional hockey because of his broken knee.  He is currently working as the Director of European Scouting for the Ottawa Senators.

Mikko Ruutu has two brothers, Jarkko, a former NHL player who retired in 2014, and Tuomo, who plays in the NLA for HC Davos.

Career statistics

See also
Notable families in the NHL

External links

1978 births
Living people
Finnish ice hockey right wingers
HIFK (ice hockey) players
Jokerit players
Kiekko-Vantaa players
Ottawa Senators draft picks
Ottawa Senators scouts
Sportspeople from Vantaa
Clarkson Golden Knights men's ice hockey players